The Hassell House is a historic house at South Elm and West Woodruff Streets in Searcy, Arkansas.  It is a -story brick structure, with a hip roof that slopes down to gable sections.  A porch extends around the main (north-facing) elevation to the east side, with Doric columns supporting it.  Built about 1910, it is a rare surviving example in the town of a brick house from this period.

The House was listed on the National Register of Historic Places in 1991.

See also
National Register of Historic Places listings in White County, Arkansas

References

Houses on the National Register of Historic Places in Arkansas
Houses completed in 1910
Houses in Searcy, Arkansas
National Register of Historic Places in Searcy, Arkansas
1910 establishments in Arkansas